Actors: Songs Connection, stylized as ACTORS: Songs Connection, is a Japanese multimedia franchise created by Exit Tunes. It began as a series of drama CDs released in 2014, before having an anime television series for the franchise announced. The television series ran for twelve episodes from October to December 2019.

Characters

Production and release
The series began as a series of drama CDs released by Exit Tunes in March 2014. In November 2018, an anime television series adaptation was announced. The series was produced by Drive, with direction and script writing by Osamu Yamasaki, character designs by Asako Nishida, and music composed by Hideakira Kimura, Tomotaka Ōsumi, and Hiroaki Tsutsumi. While the first episode had an advanced screening at Anime Expo on July 7, 2019, the series officially aired on Tokyo MX and other channels from October 6 to December 22, 2019. The series ran for twelve episodes. The series' opening theme is "Titania", while its ending theme is "Inazuma Shock"; both were performed by the series' Japanese and English cast members.

The series is licensed outside of Asia by Funimation. An English dub, produced by Sound Cadence Studios, was released on Funimation's streaming service on November 24, 2019.

Episode list

Reception
Rebecca Silverman, Theron Martin, and Nick Creamer from Anime News Network praised the character designs and music, while criticizing the story as basic and the characters as unemotional. Vrai Kaiser from Anime Feminist praised the music and animation, while also criticizing the characters as bland and unoriginal.

Notes

References

External links
  
 

2019 anime television series debuts
Funimation
Music in anime and manga
Tokyo MX original programming